David Lipper (born February 17, 1974) is a Canadian actor, director, producer and writer. He is best known for his role as Viper in the ABC television sitcom Full House (1994–1995). His other roles include Jace in the television film She Fought Alone (1995), Robert Trump in Trump Unauthorized (2006), Amos in the television miniseries Sons of Liberty (2015) and Robbie Womack in the television series Frequency (2017).

Early life
Lipper was born in Montreal, Quebec on February 17, 1974. He grew up in Montreal and moved to Los Angeles after completing his BFA in Musical Theater from Emerson College in Boston.

Career

Acting
Lipper made his first screen appearance when he appeared in the 1988 television series Time of Your Life.

Lipper appeared as Viper, one of the main characters' boyfriends in the ABC television sitcom Full House, a role in which he reprised in Fuller House. He then appeared as the sadistic character of Brian Austin Greene's character's best friend Jace in the 1995 film She Fought Alone.

He appeared in films such as Dante's Peak, Bug Buster, The Pacifier and Two Jacks. He appeared as Bob Deacon in the action film Dying of the Light.

Producing
In 2021, Lipper and Robert A. Daley Jr founded their production company Latigo Films, which Creative Artists Agency had signed them. The company's first film was the romantic comedy film My Favorite Girlfriend, which Saban Films distributed and released in select theaters on August 5, 2021. The company will produce upcoming films, including the noir film Joe Baby, featuring Ron Perlman, Willa Fitzgerald, Dichen Lachman and Harvey Keitel, the action-thriller film Hunt Club, featuring Mena Suvari and Mickey Rourke, and another action-thriller film Murder at Hollow Creek, where he will also star. In his interview, Lipper stated: "We are absolutely thrilled to be working with CAA, and we look forward to connecting with all the agents and talent there to create the best possible movies we can.".

Directing
In 2021, he made his directing debut when he directed the film Death Link. Following the success of Death Link, Lipper is set to direct the upcoming films Murder at Hollow Creek (which he will also star in), and Wolf Mountain.

Filmography

Film

Television

References

External links
 David Lipper
 
 
 

1974 births
Canadian male film actors
Canadian male television actors
Canadian male voice actors
Canadian male screenwriters
Canadian expatriates in the United States
Canadian expatriate male actors in the United States
Male actors from Montreal
Writers from Montreal
Emerson College alumni
Living people
20th-century Canadian male actors
21st-century Canadian male actors